Perçem can refer to:

 Perçem, Alaca
 Perçem, Refahiye